Avril Anderson (born 10 June 1953) is an English music educator and composer.

Biography
Avril Anderson was born in Southsea, Hampshire, England. In 1972 she entered the Royal College of Music where she studied with Humphrey Searle and John Lambert. In 1996 she continued her studies at the New England Conservatory with David del Tredici in New York City.

Anderson won the Cobbett Prize for composition, and her music has been performed in Europe, Australia and the United States. Anderson has directed educational projects, and took a position at the Royal College of Music in 2001. She is co-artistic director with her husband David Sutton-Anderson of Sounds Positive and has been Composer-in-Residence for the Young Place London Contemporary Dance School since 1990.

Works
Anderson has composed for orchestra, chorus, instrumental ensembles, solo instruments and voice. Selected works include:

The grass is sleeping
The Lone Piper
Lines in the Sand
Le Carillon de Cythère

Discography
Contemporary British Organ Music volume 2 Audio CD, 2010, ASIN: B003U4GBGA SFZ Music
Spectrum 2
Prime Cuts

References

1953 births
20th-century classical composers
21st-century classical composers
British music educators
English classical composers
Women classical composers
Living people
20th-century English composers
20th-century English women musicians
21st-century English women musicians
Women music educators
20th-century women composers
21st-century women composers